The English women's cricket team toured Australia between 7 December 1984 and 3 February 1985 to contest The Women's Ashes for the ninth time. Australia won the five match Test series 2–1 to claim the Ashes for the first time since 1963.

A three match WODI series was also played where Australia won 3–0. Prior to and in between the Test matches, England played 11 tour matches – winning 6, losing 3, drawing 1 and 1 ended in no result.

Tour matches

50-over match: Western Australia Women vs England Women

50-over match: Western Australia Women vs England Women

50-over match: Western Australia Women vs England Women

60-over match: South Australia Women vs England Women

60-over match: Queensland Women vs England Women

60-over match: Queensland Women vs England Women

2-day match: New South Wales Women vs England Women

50-over match: New South Wales Country Women vs England Women

55-over match: Australian Women's Cricket Council President's XI vs England Women

55-over match: Victoria Women vs England Women

55-over match: Victoria Women vs England Women

Test series

1st Test

2nd Test

3rd Test

4th Test

5th Test

WODI series

1st WODI

2nd WODI

3rd WODI

References

1984 in women's cricket
1985 in women's cricket
1985 in Australian cricket
1985 in English cricket
1984–85 Australian cricket season
Australia 1985
International cricket competitions from 1980–81 to 1985
The Women's Ashes
Eng 1985